József Vida (born  January 9, 1963 in Sárvár, Vas) is a retired male hammer thrower from Hungary, who represented his native country at the 1988 Summer Olympics in Seoul, South Korea. He set his personal best (76.01 metres) on July 4, 1999 in Tapolca.

Achievements

References
 sports-reference

1963 births
Living people
People from Sárvár
Hungarian male hammer throwers
Athletes (track and field) at the 1988 Summer Olympics
Olympic athletes of Hungary
Sportspeople from Vas County